The Bayer designations i Velorum and I Velorum are distinct. Due to technical limitations, both designations link here. For the star
i Velorum, see HD 95370
I Velorum, see HD 81848

See also
J Velorum (MV Velorum)
l Velorum
L Velorum

Velorum, i
Vela (constellation)